Melissa Lord (born June 24, 1997) is an American tennis player.

Lord made her WTA main draw debut at the 2017 Bank of the West Classic in the doubles draw partnering Carol Zhao.

Lord plays college tennis at Stanford University.

References

External links

1997 births
Living people
American female tennis players
Sportspeople from Hartford, Connecticut
Stanford Cardinal women's tennis players
Tennis people from Connecticut